Dami may refer to the following people
Given name
Dami Bakare (born 1988), British volleyball player
Dami Im (born 1988), Korean-Australian singer and songwriter

Surname
Abdellah Dami (born 1982), Moroccan-Dutch journalist
Elisabetta Dami (born 1958), Italian children's fiction writer

See also
Dhami (surname)